Aminiphilus is a Gram-negative, non-spore-forming and motile genus of bacteria from the family of Synergistaceae with one known species (Aminiphilus circumscriptus). Aminiphilus circumscriptus has been isolated from anaerobic sludge from Colombia.

References

Synergistota
Bacteria genera
Monotypic bacteria genera